The Tannehill Ironworks is the central feature of Tannehill Ironworks Historical State Park near the unincorporated town of McCalla in Tuscaloosa County, Alabama. Listed on the National Register of Historic Places as Tannehill Furnace, it was a major supplier of iron for Confederate ordnance. The  park includes: the John Wesley Hall Grist Mill; the May Plantation Cotton Gin House; and the Iron & Steel Museum of Alabama.

History

Ironmaking at the site began with construction of a bloomery forge by Daniel Hillman Sr. in 1830. Built by noted southern ironmaster Moses Stroup from 1859 to 1862, the three charcoal blast furnaces at Tannehill could produce 22 tons of pig iron a day, most of which was shipped to the Naval Gun Works and Arsenal at Selma. Furnaces Nos. 2 and 3 were equipped with hot blast stoves and a steam engine. Brown iron ore mines were present two miles (3 km) distant.

The Tannehill furnaces and its adjacent foundry, where kettles and hollow-ware were cast for southern troops, were attacked and burnt by three companies of the U.S. 8th Iowa Cavalry on March 31, 1865 during Wilson's Raid. The ruins remain today as one of the best preserved 19th-century iron furnace sites in the South.

Also known as the Roupes Valley Iron Company, these works had significant influence on the later development of the Birmingham iron and steel industry.  An experiment conducted at Tannehill in 1862 proved red iron ore could successfully be used in Alabama blast furnaces. The test, promoted by South & North Railroad developers, led to the location of government-financed ironworks in the immediate Birmingham area (Jefferson County).
Listings
The furnace remains and its reconstructed portions were named an American Society for Metals historical landmark in 1994. The park is an American Battlefield Trust Heritage Site, a stop on the Alabama Appalachian Highlands Birding Trail, and was listed among the top 10 Alabama parks and nature areas visited in 2016.

See also
Birmingham District
Brierfield Furnace
Shelby Ironworks

References

External links

 Tannehill Ironworks Historical State Park Alabama Historic Ironworks Commission 
 
 

Industrial buildings completed in 1862
State parks of Alabama
Ironworks and steel mills in Alabama
National Register of Historic Places in Tuscaloosa County, Alabama
Alabama in the American Civil War
Protected areas of Tuscaloosa County, Alabama
Mountain biking venues in Alabama
Museums in Tuscaloosa County, Alabama
Wilson's Raid
Industry museums in Alabama
History museums in Alabama
Industrial buildings and structures on the National Register of Historic Places in Alabama
Blast furnaces in the United States
1862 establishments in Alabama
Historic American Buildings Survey in Alabama
Historic American Engineering Record in Alabama
American Civil War on the National Register of Historic Places